Live at the Bass Performance Hall is a live album by Fleetwood Mac guitarist/vocalist Lindsey Buckingham.  It was released on March 25, 2008 on  DVD and a CD/DVD combo. The performances were recorded at the Bass Performance Hall in Fort Worth, Texas on January 27, 2007 when Buckingham and his backing band were on tour promoting the Under the Skin album. Live at the Bass Performance Hall peaked at #186 on the Billboard 200 album chart in March 2008.

Track listing
All tracks written by Buckingham except where noted.

CD
"Not Too Late" – 6:38
"Trouble" – 4:22
"Never Going Back Again" – 3:37
"Second Hand News" – 3:42
"Cast Away Dreams" – 4:33
"It Was You" – 3:17
"Big Love" – 3:29
"Go Insane" – 4:47
"Under the Skin" – 4:05
"I'm So Afraid" – 9:14
"I Know I'm Not Wrong" – 4:11
"Go Your Own Way" – 6:57
"Holiday Road" – 3:11
"Show You How" – 4:49
"Shut Us Down" (Buckingham, Sipper) – 6:04

DVD
"Not Too Late"
"Trouble"
"Never Going Back Again"
"Second Hand News"
"Cast Away Dreams"
"It Was You"
"Big Love"
"Go Insane"
"Under the Skin"
"I'm So Afraid"
"I Know I'm Not Wrong"
"Tusk"
"Go Your Own Way"
"Holiday Road"
"Show You How"
"Shut Us Down'

DVD only bonus:  "Not Too Late" documentary

Personnel 

Band:
Lindsey Buckingham – guitars, lead vocals
Brett Tuggle – bass, guitars, keyboards, vocals
Neale Heywood – guitars, vocals
Taku Hirano – drums, percussion
Lindsay Vannoy – additional keyboards

Management:
Tom Consolo – executive producer
Evan Haiman – executive producer
Amy Gibbons – associate producer
Sarah Iversen – associate producer
Hank Lena – director
David Butler – associate director

Crew: 
Brian Shelton – technical director 
Chance Wimberly – stage manager
Andy Elias – set/lighting designer
Ray Lindsey – sound mixer
Dan Nabors – engineer
Glen Nickerson – production coordinator
Jason Garren – production coordinator
Dave Barrera – guitar technician

Cinematographers:
Paul Burnham – camera operator
Kenny Dezendorf – camera operator
Tom Harker – camera operator
Ron Ingram – camera operator
Ed Martinez – camera operator
Dan Peterson – camera operator

Post-production:
Ray Volkema – editor
Jacque McNair – post-production coordinator

References

Lindsey Buckingham albums
Albums produced by Lindsey Buckingham
albums produced by Rob Cavallo
2006 live albums
2006 video albums
Live video albums
Reprise Records live albums
Reprise Records video albums